The Shue House is a historic house at 108 Holly Street in Beebe, Arkansas.  It is a storey and a half wood-frame structure, finished in brick, with a cross-gable roof and a brick foundation.  A gabled wall dormer features a half-timbered stucco exterior, and large knee brackets.  The house, built in 1935 by the owner of a local oil company, is one of the city's best examples of late Craftsman architecture.

The house was listed on the National Register of Historic Places in 1991.

See also
National Register of Historic Places listings in White County, Arkansas

References

Houses on the National Register of Historic Places in Arkansas
Houses completed in 1935
Houses in White County, Arkansas
National Register of Historic Places in White County, Arkansas
Buildings and structures in Beebe, Arkansas
1935 establishments in Arkansas
Bungalow architecture in Arkansas
American Craftsman architecture in Arkansas